Filipe José Valente Vinagre Soares (born 28 November 1994 in Alvor - Portimão) is a Portuguese footballer who plays for Portimonense S.C. as a midfielder.

Football career
On 1 September 2013, Soares made his professional debut with Portimonense in a 2013–14 Segunda Liga match against Atlético replacing Mica (81st minute).

References

External links

1994 births
Living people
Portuguese footballers
Association football midfielders
Liga Portugal 2 players
Portimonense S.C. players
People from Portimão
Sportspeople from Faro District